The Men competition at the 2017 World Championships was held on 25 and 26 February 2017.

Results

500 m
The race was started on 25 February 2017 at 13:18.

1000 m
The race was started on 25 February 2017 at 15:07.

500 m
The race was started on 26 February 2017 at 13:22.

1000 m
The race was started on 26 February 2017 at 15:07.

Overall standings
After all events.

References

Men